Lia Torá (born Horacia Correa D'Avila; May 12, 1907 – 1972) was a Brazilian dancer and film actress.

Selected filmography
 The Low Necker (1927)
 The Veiled Woman (1929)
 Making the Grade (1929)
 There Were Thirteen (1931)
 Hollywood, City of Dreams (1931)

References

Bibliography
 Pancho Kohner. Lupita Tovar The Sweetheart of Mexico. Xlibris Corporation, 2011.

External links

1907 births
1972 deaths
Brazilian people of Spanish descent
Brazilian people of Portuguese descent
Brazilian film actresses
Actresses from Rio de Janeiro (city)
Brazilian female dancers
20th-century Brazilian actresses